E-Liner Airways Inc., better known as DBA (ELA Airlines), was established in 1993.  The company started with sightseeing flights and day tours to Aruba and Bonaire.  It is based at the Hato International Airport, Willemstad, Curaçao.

IATA designator: EL
ICAO designator: ELA
Numeric Code: 123

Services
Daily commuter flights between Curaçao and Aruba
Daily commuter flights between Curaçao and Bonaire
Charter flights within the Caribbean

It also serves:
Bogotá, Colombia
Valencia, Venezuela
Maiquetía, Venezuela (airport serving the capital Caracas)
Las Piedras, Venezuela

Fleet
2 - Piper PA-31 Navajo Chieftain
1 - Piper PA-34 Seneca

External links
Official website
Picture of PJ-WLS
Picture of PJ-WNY 
Caribbean Aviation

Airlines of the Netherlands Antilles
Airlines of Curaçao
1993 establishments in the Netherlands Antilles
Airlines established in 1993